Jorge Vazquez may refer to:

Jorge Vázquez (baseball), Mexican baseball player
Jorge Vázquez (bishop), Argentine Roman Catholic prelate
Jorge Javier Vázquez, Spanish TV presenter and writer
Jorge Vázquez Viaña, Bolivian revolutionary, member of Che Guevara's guerrilla fighters

See also
 Jorge Vásquez (disambiguation)